Dikri Yusron Afafa (born 8 January 1995) is an Indonesian professional footballer who plays as a goalkeeper for Liga 1 club Persik Kediri.

Club career

Sriwijaya
He was signed for Sriwijaya to play in Liga 1 in the 2017 season. Yusron made his league debut on 25 October 2017 in a match against PS TNI at the Pakansari Stadium, Cibinong.

Badak Lampung
In 2019, Yusron signed a year contract with Liga 1 club Badak Lampung. He made his league debut on 24 May 2019 in a match against PSM Makassar at the Andi Mattalatta Stadium, Makassar.

Persik Kediri
On 10 March 2021, he signed one-year contract with Liga 1 club Persik Kediri. He made his debut on 27 August, as a starter in a 1–0 defeat to Bali United at the Gelora Bung Karno Stadium, Jakarta.

International career
In 2014, Dikri Yusron represented the Indonesia U-19, in the 2014 AFF U-19 Youth Championship.

Career statistics

Club

Honours

Club
Sriwijaya
 East Kalimantan Governor Cup: 2018

References

External links
 Dikri Yusron at Soccerway
 Dikri Yusron at Liga Indonesia

1995 births
Living people
People from Ciamis
Sportspeople from West Java
Indonesian footballers
Liga 1 (Indonesia) players
Sriwijaya F.C. players
Badak Lampung F.C. players
Persik Kediri players
Association football goalkeepers
Indonesia youth international footballers